This is a list of player transfers involving United Rugby Championship rugby union teams between the end of the 2022–23 season and before the start of the 2023–24 season.

Benetton

Players In
 Andy Uren from  Bristol Bears
 Malakai Fekitoa from  Munster
 Edoardo Iachizzi from  Vannes

Players Out
 Manfredi Albanese retiring

Bulls

Players In
 Wilco Louw from  Harlequins 
 Jannes Kirsten from  Exeter Chiefs 
 Henry Immelman from  Edinburgh 
 Sebastian de Klerk from  Pumas

Players Out

Cardiff

Players In

Players Out
 Max Llewellyn to  Gloucester

Connacht

Players In
 Joe Joyce from  Bristol Bears 
 Sean Jansen from  Leicester Tigers
 Andrew Smith from  Leinster
 Seán O'Brien from  Leinster

Players Out
 Kieran Marmion to  Bristol Bears
 Alex Wootton retiring

Dragons

Players In

Players Out

Edinburgh

Players In
 Ben Healy from  Munster 
 Robin Hislop from  Saracens
 Javan Sebastian from  Scarlets
 Mikey Jones promoted from Academy
 Harry Paterson promoted from Academy
 Cameron Scott promoted from Academy

Players Out
 Henry Immelman to  Bulls
 Murray McCallum to  Newcastle Falcons

Glasgow Warriors

Players In

Players Out
 Lewis Bean to  Montauban

Leinster

Players In

Players Out
 Jonathan Sexton retiring
 Andrew Smith to  Connacht
 Seán O'Brien to  Connacht

Lions

Players In

Players Out

Munster

Players In
 John Ryan from  Chiefs
 Alex Nankivell from  Chiefs

Players Out
 Ben Healy to  Edinburgh
 Kiran McDonald to  Newcastle Falcons
 Malakai Fekitoa to  Benetton

Ospreys

Players In

Players Out

Scarlets

Players In

Players Out
 Javan Sebastian to  Edinburgh 
 Sione Kalamafoni to  Vannes

Sharks

Players In

Players Out
 Siya Kolisi to  Racing 92 
 Thaakir Abrahams to  Lyon 
 Carlü Sadie to  Bordeaux 
 Ben Tapuai to  Bordeaux

Stormers

Players In

Players Out
 Steven Kitshoff to  Ulster

Ulster

Players In
 Steven Kitshoff from  Stormers
 Dave Ewers from  Exeter Chiefs

Players Out
 Frank Bradshaw Ryan to  Montauban

Zebre Parma

Players In
 Giacomo Ferrari promoted from Academy
 Riccardo Genovese promoted from Academy
 Luca Rizzoli promoted from Academy
 Jake Polledri from  Gloucester

Players Out

See also
List of 2023–24 Premiership Rugby transfers
List of 2023–24 RFU Championship transfers
List of 2023–24 Super Rugby transfers
List of 2023–24 Top 14 transfers
List of 2023–24 Rugby Pro D2 transfers
List of 2023–24 Major League Rugby transfers

References

2023–24 United Rugby Championship
2023-24